Charles George Mullen (March 15, 1889 – June 6, 1963) was a Major League Baseball first baseman. From 1910 to 1911, Mullen played for the Chicago White Sox, who kept him at first base almost exclusively throughout his two seasons with the team.  After a three-year absence, Mullen came back to the major leagues for play for the New York Yankees from 1914 to 1916. He had 183 hits in 741 at bats and 87 RBIs.

Mullen died in Seattle, Washington.  He is interred at Evergreen Washelli Memorial Park.

References

External links

 

1889 births
1963 deaths
Baseball players from Washington (state)
New York Yankees players
Chicago White Sox players
Minor league baseball managers
Gonzaga Bulldogs football coaches
Portland Colts players
Winchester Hustlers players
Lincoln Railsplitters players
Lincoln Tigers players
Richmond Climbers players
Toledo Iron Men players
Seattle Rainiers players
Washington Huskies baseball players